Fan′s Best is a compilation album by Miyavi released on March 24, 2010. It contains 10 songs selected by fans and 5 bonus tracks selected by the artist. It charted 212th on Oricon.

Track listing

References

2010 albums
Miyavi albums